Mawjhai Amu or the Amu Waves is a professional football team from Afghanistan. They play in the Afghan Premier League. It was founded in August 2012 by the creation of Afghan Premier League and its players have been chosen through a casting-show called Maidan-E-Sabz (Green Field). Based in the city of Kunduz, club represents provinces of Kunduz, Badakhshan, Takhar and Baghlan in the northeastern region of Afghanistan.

References

Football clubs in Afghanistan
Kunduz Province
2012 establishments in Afghanistan
Association football clubs established in 2012